Mist on the Sea (Italian: Nebbie sul mare) is a 1944 Italian drama film directed by Marcello Pagliero and Hans Hinrich and starring Viveca Lindfors, Gustav Diessl and Umberto Spadaro. The film's sets were designed by the art director Salvo D'Angelo.

Synopsis
Italian couple Maria and Pietro Rosati live in Brazil, where they manage an estate. One day Maria is sexually assaulted, and her husband kills the preparator. Pietro is pursued by the police and is shot and tumbles into a river. Maria is charged as an accomplice, but after a lengthy trial she is acquitted. A few years later she is working as an assistant to a doctor at a research institute. They fall in love and marry, but when Brazil enters the Second World War all Italian citizens are expelled from the country, and they catch the last available ship for Italy. To Maria’s shock, they discover Pietro working as a stoker in the engine room; he miraculously survived his fall into the river and has been laying low to avoid arrest. He demands that his wife return to him, but she says she is pregnant and loves her second husband, even if the marriage is technically invalid. When the ship hits a mine, Pietro nobly sacrifices himself by helping Maria and the doctor into a lifeboat and then cutting the rope.

Cast
 Viveca Lindfors as 	Maria Rosati
 Gustav Diessl as 	Pietro Rosati
 Otello Toso as 	Il dottore Leonardo Monti
 Umberto Spadaro as 	Il fuochista
 Claudio Ermelli as 	Silva
 Carmen Navascués as 	Dolores, la ballerina
 Adele Garavaglia as La governante di Leonardo
 Guido Morisi as 	Ruiz, il direttore del laboratorio sieroterapico
 Carlo Duse as 	Lopez, il creditore
 Mario Brizzolari as 	Un membro della Commissione di Sanità
 Aristide Garbini as 	Il capitano della nave
 Giulio Battiferri as	Il direttore della ditta commerciale
 Bruno Smith as	L'ufficiale sulla nave
 Stefano Sibaldi as Il suonatore di contrabasso
 Roberto Manzi as 	Il vicecomandante della nave

References

Bibliography 
 Qvist, Per Olov & von Bagh, Peter. Guide to the Cinema of Sweden and Finland. Greenwood Publishing Group, 2000

External links 
 

1944 films
Italian drama films
1944 drama films
1940s Italian-language films
Films directed by Marcello Pagliero
Films directed by Hans Hinrich
Italian black-and-white films
Titanus films
Films set in Brazil
Seafaring films
1940s Italian films